Glenea novemguttata is a species of beetle in the family Cerambycidae. It was described by Félix Édouard Guérin-Méneville in 1831, originally under the genus Sphenura. It is known from Malaysia, Java and Sumatra.

References

novemguttata
Beetles described in 1831